The Kharkiv Romantic School was a young poets' group among the faculty and students of Kharkiv University in the 1830s and 1840s. The name was proposed by the publisher of their works, researcher Ahapii Shamrai.

Members included Izmail Sreznevskyi, Amvrosii Metlynskyi, Mykola Kostomarov, Levko Borovykovskyi, Mykhailo Petrenko, Ivan Roskovshenko, Opanas Shpyhotskyi, Oleksandr Korsun, and Yakiv Shchoholiv.

Further reading 

 
 
 

Ukrainian poetry
Ukrainian literary movements
National University of Kharkiv